Ciancio is an Italian surname. Notable people with the surname include:
Gaetano Ciancio  (born 1956), Italian Transplant surgeon
Daniela Ciancio (born 1965), Italian costume designer
Pedro de Ciancio (born 1938), Argentine footballer
Simone Ciancio (born 1987), Italian footballer
Josephine Gatt Ciancio (born 1946), Maltese social scientist, and minor philosopher

See also 
 De Ciancio

Italian-language surnames